Verismo (from , "true") was an Italian literary movement which peaked between approximately 1875 and the early 1900s. Giovanni Verga and Luigi Capuana were its main exponents and the authors of a verismo manifesto. Capuana published the novel Giacinta, generally regarded as the "manifesto" of Italian verismo. Unlike French naturalism, which was based on positivistic ideals, Verga and Capuana rejected claims of the scientific nature and social usefulness of the movement.

Literary verismo was begun between around 1875 and 1895 by a group of writers – mostly novelists and playwrights. It did not constitute a formal school, but it was still based on specific principles. Its birth was influenced by a positivist climate which put absolute faith in science, empiricism and research and which developed from 1830 until the end of the 19th century. It was also clearly based on naturalism, a literary movement which spread in France in the mid-19th century. Naturalist writers included Émile Zola and Guy de Maupassant; for them, literature should objectively portray society and humanity like a photograph, strictly representing even the humblest social class in even its most unpleasant aspects, with the authors analysing real modern life like scientists.

Literary verismo developed in the fruitful urban cultural life of Milan, which brought together intellectuals from different areas, but tended to portray central and southern Italian life – Sicily is described in the works of Verga, Capuana and Federico de Roberto, Naples in works by Matilde Serao and Salvatore di Giacomo, Sardinia in the works of Grazia Deledda, Rome in the poems of Cesare Pascarella and Tuscany in works by Renato Fucini.

The first author to theorize on Italian verismo was Capuana, who theorized the "poetry of the real" – thus Verga, at first part of the late Romantic literary movement (he was called the poet of the duchesses and had considerable success), later shifted to verismo with his short story collections Vita dei campi and Novelle rusticane and finally with the first novel of the 'Ciclo dei Vinti' cycle, I Malavoglia in 1881. Sicilian-born, Verga lived in Florence during the same period as the verismo painters – 1865 to 1867 – and his best known story, "Cavalleria rusticana", contains certain verbal parallels to the effects achieved on canvas by the Tuscan landscape school of this era. "Espousing an approach that later put him in the field of verismo, his particular sentence structure and rhythm have some of the qualities of the macchia. Like the Macchiaioli, he was fascinated by topographical exactitude set in a nationalist framework"— to quote from Albert Boime's work, The Art of the Macchia and the Risorgimento. Verga and verismo differed from naturalism, however, in their desire to introduce the reader's point of view on the matter while not revealing the author's personal opinions.

See also
 Verismo (music)
 Verismo (painting)

Notes and references

Literary movements
Literary realism
Naturalism (literature)
Italian literature
Italian literary movements